Micromastra isoldalis is a species of snout moth, and the only species in the genus Micromastra. It was described by William Schaus in 1940 and is known from the US territory of Puerto Rico.

References

Moths described in 1940
Pyralinae
Monotypic moth genera
Moths of the Caribbean
Pyralidae genera